Perochirus guentheri, also known as Gunther's tropical gecko or Vanuatu saw-tailed gecko, is a species of lizard in the family Gekkonidae. It is endemic to Vanuatu.

References

Perochirus
Reptiles described in 1885